Nick Jr. is an Italian television channel, aimed at a pre-school children audience. It launched on 31 July 2009 on Sky Italia on channel 602 to replace RaiSat YOYO, which then became free and is now named Rai Yoyo.

From November 10, 2009, Nick Jr. switches to Channel 603. Since July 4, 2011 of the timeshift service called Nick Jr. +1, which offers the same Nick Jr. programming one hour after the numbering 604. Since 10 June 2013, together with the timeshift Nick Jr. +1 the channel broadcasts in wide-screen 16:9 and were renewed bumper, graphics and promos.

External links

Italy
Telecom Italia Media
Children's television networks
Television channels in Italy
Television channels and stations established in 2009
Italian-language television stations
2009 establishments in Italy